Inis Mór, Irish for "big island", may refer to:
Inishmore, one of the Aran Islands
Deer Island, in the Shannon Estuary
Church Island, in Lough Gill